Sara Negri (born January 21, 1967) is a mathematical logician who studies proof theory.
She is Italian, worked in Finland for several years, where she was a professor of theoretical philosophy in the University of Helsinki, and currently holds a position as professor of mathematical logic at the University of Genoa.

Education and career
Negri was born in Padua, and studied at the University of Padua. She earned a master's degree there in 1991 and a Ph.D. in 1996, both in mathematics. Her dissertation, Dalla Topologia Formale all'Analisi, was supervised by Giovanni Sambin.

She went to Helsinki as a docent in 1998, and became a full professor there in 2015. She has also taken several visiting positions, including a Humboldt Fellowship in 2004–2005 at the Ludwig Maximilian University of Munich. She became full professor of mathematical logic at the University of Genoa, in Italy, in 2019.

Recognition
Negri was elected to the Academia Europaea in 2018.

Books
Negri is the co-author, with Jan von Plato, of two books:
Structural Proof Theory (Cambridge University Press, 2001)
Proof Analysis: A Contribution to Hilbert's Last Problem (Cambridge University Press, 2011)

References

External links

1967 births
Living people
Italian mathematicians
Italian philosophers
Finnish mathematicians
Finnish philosophers
Women mathematicians
Italian women philosophers
Mathematical logicians
Women logicians
University of Padua alumni
Academic staff of the University of Helsinki
Italian expatriates in Finland
Members of Academia Europaea